Netball at the Commonwealth Games was first played in 1990 as a demonstration sport. It has been an official Commonwealth Games sport since 1998. Together with the Netball World Cup, the Commonwealth Games netball tournament is one of the two major tournaments in international netball. All the major netball playing nations are members of the Commonwealth of Nations. Australia have been the tournament's most successful team, winning four gold medals. New Zealand have won two gold medals. Between 1998 and 2014, Australia and New Zealand contested every final and won every gold and silver medal between them. In 2018, England became only the third team to both reach the final and win the gold medal.

History

Tournaments
In 1990, Australia defeated New Zealand in a one-off match when netball was a demonstration sport.  In 1998, Jill McIntosh guided Australia to the inaugural Commonwealth title after they defeated New Zealand 42–39 in the final. In 2002, Australia defended their title, again after defeating New Zealand in the final, this time courtesy of a Sharelle McMahon goal in double extra time. 

In 2006 New Zealand won the gold medal for the first time with a 60–55 win over Australia.  In 2010, New Zealand, led by Maria Tutaia and Irene van Dyk, won their second gold medal after they defeated Australia 66–64 in an epic encounter. Tutaia scored the winning goal in double extra time after 84 minutes of play. In 2014, Australia won their third Commonwealth title after defeating New Zealand 58–40 in the final. Caitlin Bassett scored 49 from 53 at 92% accuracy to clinch the title. 

In 2018, England caused a major surprise when they defeated Australia in the final. Helen Housby scored in the final second to give England a 52–51 victory. As a result England became only the third team to both reach the final and win the gold medal.

Bronze medal matches

Finals

All-time medal table

Participating teams

Notes
  In 1990 no medals were awarded as netball was only a demonstration sport.

References

 
Sports at the Commonwealth Games
Commonwealth Games
Commonwealth Games